This topic covers notable events and articles related to 2017 in music.

Specific locations

African
American
Asian
Australian
Brazilian
British
Canadian
Chinese
Danish
European
Finnish
French
German
Icelandic
Indian
Irish
Japanese
Latin
Malaysian
Mongolian
Norwegian
Philippine
Polynesian
Scandinavian
South Korean
Swedish
Taiwanese
Vietnamese
World

Specific genres 

Classical
Country
Electronic
Jazz
Latin
Heavy metal
Hip hop
Rock
R&B 
New Wave 
Opera
Pop
Punk

Albums released

Awards

Bands formed

 =LOVE
 22/7
 3RACHA
 7Senses
 14U
 22/7
 A.C.E
 Adoy
 Bad Wolves
 Be.A
 Black Dresses
 Bloodywood
 Brats
 THE BOYZ
 Busters
 Cellchrome
 Chō Tokimeki Sendenbu
 CY8ER
 Cynhn
 Dimlim
 Dreamcatcher
 Duetto
 Elris
 Faky
 FanxyRed
 Favorite
 Fever 333
 Fontaines D.C.
 Fromis 9
 Ghost Light
 Giants in the Trees
 Gizmodrome
 Grayscale
 GreatGuys
 Golden Child
 Good Day
 Hash Tag
 Highlight
 Honeyst
 Hyeongseop X Euiwoong
 IN2IT
 In Real Life
 IZ
 JBJ
 Josh Todd and the Conflict
 Lovebites
 Leetspeak Monsters
 Longguo & Shihyun
 Måneskin
 Mastersystem
 Mellow Mellow
 Mind U
 MVP
 MXM
 My Indigo
 Myteen
 NGT48
 Novelbright
 Now United
 NU'EST W
 ONF
 Pale Waves
 Pink Babies
 Pink Cres.
 Polkadot Stingray
 P.O.P
 Pom Poko
 Powerflo
 Pristin
 Qyoto
 Rainz
 The Rampage from Exile Tribe
 The Rose
 Roselia
 The Sea Within
 S.I.S
 Seven O'Clock
 Sons of Apollo
 Squid
 Stray Kids
 SudannaYuzuYully
 Superorganism
 Top Secret
 TRCNG
 Triple H
 Tropical Fuck Storm
 Varsity
 Wanna One
 Weki Meki
 Vespera
 YHBOYS
 Yorushika

Soloist debuts

 Adieu
 Aima Baig
 Asca
 Ashe
 Au/Ra
 Baby Ariel
 Beverly
 Camila Cabello
 Cavetown
 Chelsea Cutler
 Clairo
 Conan Gray
 Curtismith
 Diamante
 Donny Pangilinan
 DPR Live
 Gabbi Garcia
 Harry Styles
 Hatchie
 Hiroomi Tosaka
 Hoàng Yến Chibi
 Huang Xiaoyun
 I
 I'll
 Jang Han-byul
 Jeong Se-woon 
 Jeon So-yeon
 Joji
 Kang Si-ra
 Kevin Oh
 Keina Suda
 Kim Chung-ha
 Kim Petras
 Kim So-hee
 Kriesha Chu
 KSI
 Lauv
 Lee Hae-ri
 Leellamarz
 Leila Alcasid
 Lewis Capaldi
 Liam Payne
 Little Simz
 Luísa Sonza
 Maan
 Madison Beer
 Maisie Peters
 Masaki Suda
 Malu Trevejo
 Megan Thee Stallion
 Minzy
 Mxmtoon
 Nao Tōyama
 Niki
 One
 Phoebe Bridgers
 Punch
 Queen Naija
 Ravi
 Rena Nōnen
 Sabrina Claudio
 Sam Fender
 Samuel 
 Sayumi Michishige
 Sayuri
 Shuta Sueyoshi
 Seohyun
 Skylar Stecker
 Sōma Saitō
 Saweetie
 Sojung
 Soyou
 Suzy
 Tao Tsuchiya
 Woo Won-jae
 Volts Vallejo
 Youngji
 Yungblud

Bands reformed 

 As I Lay Dying
 Audioslave
 Big Dumb Face
 Carnivore
 Chimaira
 Company of Thieves
 Dreamcatcher
 Eagles
 Eighteen Visions
 Elastica
 Exhorder
 Heavy Load
 House vs. Hurricane
 Jawbreaker
 Jethro Tull
 The KLF
 Light This City
 Lionheart
 Madina Lake
 Nachtmystium
 NRG
 Orbital
 Pleymo
 Sadus
 Sleeper
 Steps
 The Streets
 Stornoway
 Sugarland
 Tripping Daisy
 Viva Brother
 The Union Underground
 Xscape

Bands on hiatus

 Camera Obscura
 Cyntia
 Dark Sermon
 Dave Matthews Band
 Disclosure
 Flumpool
 fun.
 Girls’ Generation
 Ikimono-gakari
 The Gaslight Anthem
 Heart
 The Jezabels
 Katatonia
 Karnataka
 Linkin Park
 Mejibray
 Pinegrove
 PWR BTTM
 Slipknot
 Soundgarden
 Sphere
 Tackey & Tsubasa
 Tsubaki
 Twenty One Pilots
 Vamps
 With Confidence

Bands disbanded

 A Tribe Called Quest
 Amoral
 Audioslave
 Black Sabbath
 Brontide
 The Cab
 Chairlift
 Cibo Matto
 Cinderella
 Circus Devils
 Coal Chamber
 C-ute
 The Crookes
 The Dillinger Escape Plan
 Doll Elements
 Donovan Wolfington
 Especia
 Friendzone
 Game Theory
 HIM
 Hail of Bullets
 Heaven's Basement
 Hilcrhyme
 In Dying Arms
 Letlive
 Les B.B.
 The Maccabees
 Marionette
 Mimi Meme Mimi
 Mindless Behavior
 Miss A
 Mobb Deep
 Mudcrutch
 The Pagans
 Plenty
 The Poster Boy
 Poured Out
 Prizmmy
 Reol
 Rev. from DVL
 The Roches
 The Saturdays
 Spawn of Possession
 Staind
 Sug
 Textures
 Those Who Fear
 Tom Petty and the Heartbreakers
 The Tragically Hip
 Trap Them
 Vallenfyre
 Vanna
 Vant
 We Are the Ocean
 White Ash
 White Miles
 William Control
 The Wonder Girls
 Xerath
 Yellowcard
 Your Memorial

Deaths

January
 1 – Memo Morales (79), Venezuelan rumba singer
 2 – Auriel Andrew (69), Indigenous Australian country singer
 4 – Bade Fateh Ali Khan (82), Pakistani classical music and Khyal singer
 6 – Sylvester Potts (78), American R&B singer (the Contours)
 7 – Jerzy Kossela (74), Polish rock guitarist (Czerwone Gitary)
 8 – Peter Sarstedt (75), British folk pop singer
 10 – Buddy Greco (90), American jazz singer and pianist
 11 – Tommy Allsup (83), American rock and roll guitarist
 13
 Horacio Guarany (91), Argentine folklore singer
 Richie Ingui (69), American soul singer (Soul Survivors)
 14 – John Boudreaux (80), American jazz and soul drummer
 15 – Greg Trooper (61), American alternative country singer and songwriter
 16 
 William Onyeabor (70), Nigerian funk singer-songwriter
 Steve Wright (66), American power pop bassist and songwriter (The Greg Kihn Band)
 18 – Mike Kellie (69), British psychedelic rock and power pop drummer (Spooky Tooth, The Only Ones)
 19 – Loalwa Braz (63), Brazilian pop and lambada singer (Kaoma)
 20 
 Ronald "Bingo" Mundy (76), American singer (The Marcels)
 Joey Powers (82), American pop singer
 Tommy Tate (71), American soul singer
 21 
 Karl Hendricks (46), American alternative rock singer (The Karl Hendricks Trio)
 Walter "Junie" Morrison (62), American funk keyboardist (The Ohio Players, Parliament-Funkadelic)
 Maggie Roche (65), American folk singer (The Roches)
 22 
 Jaki Liebezeit (78), German experimental rock drummer (Can)
 Pete Overend Watts (69), British glam rock bassist and singer (Mott the Hoople, British Lions)
 23 – Bobby Freeman (76), American pop and R&B singer
 24 
 Gil Ray (60), American power pop drummer (Game Theory, The Loud Family)
 Butch Trucks (69), American rock drummer (The Allman Brothers Band, Les Brers)
 25 – Ronnie Davis (66), Jamaican reggae singer (The Tennors, The Itals)
 27 – Stan Boreson (91), American comedian, accordionist and singer
 28 
 Guitar Gable (79), American blues singer and guitarist
 Geoff Nicholls (68), British rock musician and keyboardist (Black Sabbath, Quartz)
 Alexander Tikhanovich (64), Belarusian pop singer (Verasy)  
 29 – Elkin Ramírez (54), Colombian hard rock singer (Kraken)
 30 – James Laurence (27), American hip hop musician and producer (Friendzone) (death announced on this date)
 31 
 Deke Leonard (72), British progressive rock guitarist (Man)
 John Wetton (67), British progressive rock singer, bassist, and songwriter (Asia, King Crimson)

February
 1 – Robert Dahlqvist (40), Swedish alternative rock guitarist and singer (The Hellacopters, Thunder Express, Dundertåget)
 4 – Steve Lang (67), Canadian rock bassist (April Wine)
 5 
 David Axelrod (85), American jazz musician and producer
 Sonny Geraci (70), American pop and rock singer (Climax, The Outsiders)
 7 – Svend Asmussen (100), Danish jazz violinist
 8 
 Rina Matsuno (18), Japanese pop singer (Shiritsu Ebisu Chugaku)
 Tony Särkkä (44), Swedish black metal multi-instrumentalist
 11 – Jarmila Šuláková (87), Czech folk singer
 12 
 Al Jarreau (76), American jazz singer
 Damian (52), British pop singer
 13 
 Trish Doan (31), American heavy metal bassist (Kittie) (death announced on this date)
 E-Dubble (34), American rapper
 16 – Pericoma Okoye (81), Nigerian traditional music singer
 17
 Peter Skellern (69), English easy listening singer-songwriter and pianist
 Dave Yorko (73), American rock and roll guitarist (Johnny and the Hurricanes)
 18 – Clyde Stubblefield (73), American funk and soul drummer (James Brown, The J.B.'s)
 19 – Larry Coryell (73), American jazz fusion guitarist
 20 – Huang Feili (99), Chinese classical music conductor
 23 
 Horace Parlan (86), American jazz pianist
 Leon Ware (77), American funk singer and songwriter
 25 
 Rick Chavez, American progressive metal singer and guitarist (Drive)
 Toshio Nakanishi (61), Japanese new wave guitarist (Plastics)
 Bill Paxton (61), American new wave keyboardist (Martini Ranch) and actor

March
 1 – Hiroshi Kamayatsu (78), Japanese rock singer (The Spiders, Vodka Collins)
 2 – Gata Cattana (26), Spanish rapper
 3 
 Jim Fuller (69), American surf rock guitarist (The Surfaris)
 Lyle Ritz (87), American rock bassist and ukuleleist (The Wrecking Crew)
 Danny Spooner (80), British-born Australian folk singer
 4 
 Valerie Carter (64), American rock singer and songwriter
 Edi Fitzroy (61), Jamaican reggae and dancehall singer
 Tommy Page (46), American pop singer
 6 
 Ritchie Adams (78), American songwriter and singer (The Fireflies)
 Lars Diedricson (66), Swedish rock singer (Snowstorm)
 Alberto Zedda (89), Italian conductor and musicologist
 7 – Kalika Prasad Bhattacharya (46), Indian folk singer
 8
 Dave Valentin (64), American jazz flutist
 Wordsayer (47), American rapper (Source of Labor)
 10 – Joni Sledge (60), American R&B and disco singer (Sister Sledge)
 11 
 Evan Johns (60), American rockabilly guitarist (The LeRoi Brothers)
 Ángel Parra (73), Chilean folk singer
 Don Warden (87), American country slide guitarist
 12 – Joey Alves (63), American hard rock rhythm guitarist (Y&T)
 13 
 Robert "P-Nut" Johnson, American funk singer (Parliament-Funkadelic)
 John Lever (55), British post-punk drummer (The Chameleons)
 15 
 Phil Garland (75), New Zealander folk singer
 Vicky (69), Colombian pop singer
 16 – James Cotton (81), American blues harmonica player, singer and songwriter
 18 – Chuck Berry (90), American rock and roll guitarist, singer and songwriter
 20 
 Buck Hill (90), American jazz tenor and soprano saxophonist
 Tony Terran (90), American rock and pop trumpeter (The Wrecking Crew)
 21 – Gabriel "Negru" Mafa (42), black metal drummer (Negură Bunget)
 22 
 Sib Hashian (67), American rock drummer (Boston)
 Sven-Erik Magnusson (74), Swedish pop singer and guitarist (Sven-Ingvars)
 23 – Sebastián (63), Argentine cuarteto singer
 24
 Vincent Falcone (78), American pianist (Frank Sinatra) and conductor
 Pete Shotton (75), British skiffle percussionist and washboardist (The Quarrymen)
 25 – Edward Grimes (43), American post-rock drummer (Rachel's)
 26
 Alessandro Alessandroni (92), Italian film composer and classical guitarist
 Jimmy Dotson (83), American blues singer and songwriter
 27 – Clem Curtis (76), Trinidadian-British singer (The Foundations)
 28 – Terry Fischer (70), American pop singer (The Murmaids)
 30 – Rosie Hamlin (71), American pop singer (Rosie and the Originals)

April
 1
 Lonnie Brooks (83), American blues singer and guitarist
 Ikutaro Kakehashi (87), Japanese engineer, founder of Roland Corporation, manufacturer of electronic musical instruments
 Wycliffe Noble (91), British gospel singer (The Joystrings) and architect
 3 – Brenda Jones (62), American singer (The Jones Girls)
 5 – Paul O'Neill (61), American progressive metal composer, lyricist, producer, and songwriter (Trans-Siberian Orchestra, Savatage)
 6 – David Peel (74), American folk singer and songwriter
 7 – Ben Speer (86), American gospel singer (Speer Family)
 8 – Keni Richards (60), American rock drummer (Autograph)
 9
 Alan Henderson (72), Northern Irish rock bassist (Them)
 Bob Wootton (75), American country guitarist (The Tennessee Three)
 10 – Banner Thomas (62), American hard rock bassist (Molly Hatchet)
 11
 J. Geils (71), American blues, rock and jazz guitarist (The J. Geils Band)
 Scotty Miller (65), American drummer (Instant Funk)
 Toby Smith (46), English acid jazz keyboardist, songwriter and producer (Jamiroquai)
 12 – Barry "Frosty" Smith (71), American rock drummer (Sweathog, Soulhat)
 14 – Bruce Langhorne (78), American folk singer
 15
 Tim Goshorn, 62, American country rock guitarist and singer (Pure Prairie League)
 Allan Holdsworth (70), British jazz fusion guitarist (Gong, Soft Machine, U.K.)
 Matt Holt (39), American heavy metal singer (Nothingface)
 Sylvia Moy (78), American songwriter
 19 – Dick Contino (87), American accordionist and singer
 20 – Cuba Gooding Sr. (72), American soul and R&B singer (The Main Ingredient)
 23 – Jerry Adriani (70), Brazilian rock singer
 27
 Jeff Decker, Canadian heavy metal guitarist (Thor)
 John Shifflett (64), American jazz bassist
 28 – Joanna Brouk (68), American electronic music composer

May
 1
 Bruce Hampton (70), American rock and jazz fusion singer and guitarist (Hampton Grease Band, Col. Bruce Hampton and the Aquarium Rescue Unit)
 Erkki Kurenniemi (75), Finnish electronic music composer
 2 – Kevin Garcia (41), American indie rock bassist (Grandaddy)
 3
 Casey Jones (77), American blues drummer (Johnny Winter)
 C'el Revuelta, American punk rock bassist (Black Flag)
 Saxa (83), Jamaican ska saxophonist (The Beat)
 4 – Katy Bødtger (84), Danish singer (Eurovision Song Contest 1960)
 5 – Clive Brooks (67), British progressive rock drummer (Egg)
 9
 Michael Parks (77), American country singer and actor
 Robert Miles (47), Swiss-born Italian electronic dance record producer, composer and DJ
 10
 Bonaldo "Burt" Bonaldi (90), American pop singer (The Gaylords)
 Pierre DeMudd (64), American trumpeter and singer (Dazz Band)
 11 – İbrahim Erkal (50), Turkish folk singer
 12 – Bill Dowdy (84), American jazz drummer (The Three Sounds)
 13 – Jimmy Copley (63), British rock drummer
 14 – Keith Mitchell, American dream pop drummer (Mazzy Star)
 17 – Chris Cornell (52), American alternative rock singer and songwriter (Soundgarden, Audioslave, Temple of the Dog)
 18 – Frankie Paul (51), Jamaican dancehall singer
 20
 Jimmy Dale (81), British-Canadian film and television composer
 Ace Still, American doom metal singer (Goatlord)
 21
 Kenny Cordray (62), American rock guitarist and songwriter
 Jimmy LaFave (61), American folk singer and songwriter
 Tulsa Pittaway (42), South African indie rock drummer (Watershed, Evolver One)
 22
 Rosa Speer (94), American gospel singer (Speer Family)
 Zbigniew Wodecki (67), Polish pop singer and violinist
 25 – Saucy Sylvia (96), Canadian-born American comedy music singer and pianist
 27 
 Gregg Allman (69), American rock singer, songwriter and keyboardist (The Allman Brothers Band)
 Guillermo Sanchez, Argentinian heavy metal bassist (Rata Blanca)
 29 – Arleen Lanzotti (73), American pop singer (The Delicates)
 31 – Bern Nix (69), American jazz guitarist

June
 2 – Aamir Zaki (49), Pakistani psychedelic rock guitarist
 6
 Sandra Reemer (66), Dutch pop singer
 Vin Garbutt (68), British folk singer and songwriter
 8 – Norro Wilson (79), American country music singer, songwriter and record producer
 11 – Rosalie Sorrels (83), American folk singer and songwriter
 12 – Geri Allen (60), American jazz pianist
 16 – Eliza Clívia (37), Brazilian forro singer
 17 – Thara Memory (68), American jazz trumpeter
 18 – Chris Murrell (60), American gospel and jazz singer
 20
 Prodigy (42), American rapper (Mobb Deep)
 Bo Wagner (72), American marimba player (Starbuck)
 21 – Belton Richard (77), American Cajun accordionist
 22 – Jimmy Nalls (66), American blues rock guitarist (Sea Level)
 25 – Dave Evans (66), American bluegrass singer and banjoist
 28
  Gary DeCarlo (75), American pop singer and songwriter (Steam)
  Nic Ritter (37), American thrash metal drummer (Warbringer)
  Dave Rosser (50), American alternative rock guitarist (The Afghan Whigs)
 30 – Don Rea (88), American pop singer (The Gaylords)

July
 3 – Rudy Rotta (66), Italian blues rock guitarist
 4 – John Blackwell, Jr. (43), American funk and R&B drummer (D'Angelo, The New Power Generation)
 5 – Pierre Henry (89), French musique concrète composer
 6
 Mick Bund, British post-punk bassist (Felt)
 Melvyn "Deacon" Jones (73), American soul keyboardist (Baby Huey & the Babysitters)
 9 – Erik Cartwright (66), American blues rock guitarist (Foghat)
 12
 Marc 'Blaash' Michaelson, American black metal drummer (Bahimiron)
 Tamara Miansarova (86), Russian pop singer
 Ray Phiri (70), South African jazz fusion singer and guitarist
 13
 Simon Holmes (54), Australian jangle pop guitarist (The Hummingbirds)
 Egil Kapstad (76), Norwegian jazz pianist and composer
 Chris Wong Won (53), American rapper (2 Live Crew)
 14
 Mahi Beamer (88), American-Native Hawaiian folk singer and pianist
 David Zablidowsky (38), American hard rock bassist (Adrenaline Mob, Trans-Siberian Orchestra)
 16 – Wilfried (67), Austrian pop singer
 17 – Peter Principle (63), American post-punk bassist (Tuxedomoon)
 19
 Barbara Weldens (35), French pop singer and songwriter
 Graham Wood (45), Australian jazz pianist
 20
 Chester Bennington (41), American hard rock singer and songwriter (Linkin Park, Stone Temple Pilots, Dead by Sunrise)
 Andrea Jürgens (50), German schlager singer
 21
 Errol Dyers (65), South African jazz guitarist
 Geoff Mack (94), Australian country singer and songwriter
 Kenny Shields (69), Canadian hard rock singer (Streetheart)
 Paapa Yankson (73), Ghanaian highlife singer
 22
 Polo Hofer (72), Swiss pop singer
 Bobby Taylor (83), American soul singer (Bobby Taylor & the Vancouvers)
 25
 Michael Johnson (72), American country singer and songwriter
 Geoffrey Gurrumul Yunupingu (46), Indigenous Australian folk singer and guitarist 
 27 – Billy Joe Walker Jr. (64), American country music record producer
 28 – D.L. Menard (85), American Cajun music singer
 31 – Chuck Loeb (61), American jazz guitarist (Fourplay)

August
 1 – Goldy McJohn (72), Canadian hard rock keyboardist (Steppenwolf)
 2 – Daniel Licht (60), American film and television composer
 4
 Luiz Melodia (66), Brazilian MPB singer
 Joe Romano 67, American bassist (The Fun and Games)
 8 – Glen Campbell (81), American country music singer and songwriter
 11 – Segun Bucknor (71), Nigerian soul and funk keyboardist and guitarist
 19 – Bea Wain (100), American big band singer (Larry Clinton and His Orchestra)
 20 – Jerry Lewis (91), American actor and pop singer
 21 – Sonny Burgess (88), American rockabilly singer
 22 – John Abercrombie (73), American jazz fusion guitarist
 24
 Pete Kuykendall (79), American bluegrass banjoist
 Larry Marshall (75), Jamaican reggae singer
 26 – Wilson das Neves (81), Brazilian bossa nova singer and percussionist
 28 – Melissa Bell (53), British R&B and soul singer (Soul II Soul)
 29 – Larry Elgart (95), American jazz bandleader and alto saxophonist
 30 – Skip Prokop (73), Canadian rock and jazz fusion drummer (Lighthouse, The Paupers)

September
 1 – Mick Softley (77), British folk singer and songwriter
 2 – Dave Hlubek (66), American rock guitarist and songwriter (Molly Hatchet)
 3 – Walter Becker (67), American jazz rock guitarist, bassist and songwriter (Steely Dan)
 4 – Earl Lindo (64), Jamaican reggae keyboardist (Bob Marley and the Wailers)
 5 – Rick Stevens (77), American R&B singer (Tower of Power)
 6 – Holger Czukay (79), German experimental rock bassist (Can)
 8
 Troy Gentry (50), American country singer (Montgomery Gentry)
 Don Williams (78), American country singer
 11 – Virgil Howe (41), British alternative rock drummer (Little Barrie)
 12
 Riem de Wolff (74), Dutch-Indonesian rock and roll singer (The Blue Diamonds)
 Josh Schwartz (45), American alternative country guitarist (Beachwood Sparks)
 Jessi Zazu (28), American garage rock singer and songwriter (Those Darlins)
 13 – Grant Hart (56), American alternative rock singer, songwriter and drummer (Hüsker Dü)
 17 – Laudir de Oliveira (77), Brazilian rock and jazz percussionist (Chicago)
 18 – Mark Selby (56), American blues rock singer and guitarist
 21 – Cees Bergman (65), Dutch glam rock singer (Catapult)
 22
 Ammon Tharp (75), American soul singer and drummer (Bill Deal and the Rhondels)
 Eric Eycke (41), American heavy metal singer (Corrosion of Conformity)
 23 – Charles Bradley (68), American soul singer
 27
 CeDell Davis (91), American blues guitarist
 Joy Fleming (72), German pop singer
 Hiromi Hayakawa (34), Japanese-born Mexican pop singer
 30 – Tom Paley (89), American folk guitarist and banjoist (New Lost City Ramblers)

October
 2 – Tom Petty (66), American rock singer, songwriter and guitarist (Tom Petty and the Heartbreakers, Traveling Wilburys, Mudcrutch)
 4 – Janis Hansen (74), American pop and bossa nova singer (Sérgio Mendes & Brasil '66, The Carnival)
 5
 Alvin DeGuzman, American post-hardcore guitarist (The Icarus Line)
 Rodrigo BVevino (42), British heavy metal singer (Avenger)
 6 – Bunny Sigler (76), American soul singer, songwriter and record producer
 7 – Jimmy Beaumont (76), American doo-wop singer (The Skyliners)
 8 – Grady Tate (85), American jazz drummer and singer
 16 
 Augustin Mawangu Mingiedi (56), Congolese afro-pop lkembist
 Iain Shedden (60), Australian punk rock drummer (The Saints)
 17
 Gord Downie (53), Canadian rock singer and songwriter (The Tragically Hip)
 18 – Eamonn Campbell (70), Irish folk singer and guitarist (The Dubliners)
 21 – Martin Eric Ain (50), American-Swiss heavy metal bassist (Celtic Frost)
 22 
 Al Hurricane (81), American folk singer and songwriter
 Scott Putesky (49), American heavy metal guitarist (Marilyn Manson)
 George Young (70), British-born Australian rock guitarist and songwriter (The Easybeats, Flash and the Pan)
 24 
 Fats Domino (89), American rock and roll singer and pianist
 Larry Ray (63), American power pop guitarist (Outrageous Cherry)
 27 
 Mike Hudson (61), American punk rock singer (The Pagans)
 Dick Noel (90), American big band singer
 28 
Bruce Black, American power metal drummer (Meliah Rage)
Daichi Shimoda, Japanese deathcore vocalist (Victim of Deception)
 29 
 Muhal Richard Abrams (87), American free jazz pianist
 Billy Mize (88), American country singer and steel guitarist
 Keith Wilder (65), American funk singer (Heatwave)

November
 1
 Katie Lee (98), American folk singer
 Scott Wily, American death metal singer (Vital Remains)
 2 – María Martha Serra Lima (72), Argentinean bolero singer
 3 – Gaetano Bardini (91), Italian opera singer
 5 
 Robert Knight (72), American soul singer
 Louis Roney (96), American opera tenor
 7 
 Paul Buckmaster (71), British rock and orchestral arranger and conductor
 Robert De Cormier (95), American folk arranger
 Pentti Glan (71), Finnish rock drummer (Mandala, Lou Reed, Alice Cooper)
 9 – Fred Cole (69), American garage rock singer and guitarist (The Lollipop Shoppe, Dead Moon)
 10 – Chuck Mosley (57), American alternative rock singer (Faith No More)
 11 – Chiquito de la Calzada (85), Spanish flamenco singer
 12 – Chad Hanks (46), American metal bassist (American Head Charge)
 15 
 Bonnie Flower (63), American sunshine pop singer (Wendy and Bonnie)
 Lil Peep (21), American rapper
 16 – Michael "Dik Mik" Davies (73), British space rock keyboardist (Hawkwind)
 17 – Rikard Wolff (59), Finnish pop singer and actor
 18
 Ben Riley (84), American jazz drummer
 Malcolm Young (64), Australian hard rock guitarist (AC/DC)
 19 
 Ronnie Butler (80), Bahamanian calypso singer
 Warren "Pete" Moore (79), American R&B singer (The Miracles)
 Della Reese (86), American gospel singer
 Mel Tillis (85), American country singer
 20 – Laila Sari (82), Indonesian children's music singer
 21 
 David Cassidy (67), American pop singer and actor
 Wayne Cochran (78), American soul singer and songwriter
 22 – Tommy Keene (59), American power pop singer and songwriter
 23 
 John Coates Jr. (79), American jazz pianist
 Jon Hendricks (96), American jazz singer
 Dmitri Hvorostovsky (55), Russian opera singer
 24 
 Mitch Margo (70), American doo-wop singer and songwriter (The Tokens)
 Clotilde Rosa (87), Portuguese classical harpist
 Bari Siddiqui (63), Bangladeshi folk singer and flautist
 26 – Patrick Bourgeois (54), Canadian rock singer and guitarist (Les B.B.)
 27 – Robert Popwell (66), American rock and jazz bassist (The Young Rascals, The Crusaders)
 28 – Shadia (86), Egyptian pop singer
 29 – Robert Walker (80), American blues guitarist
 30
 Jim Nabors (87), American actor and singer
 Zé Pedro (61), Portuguese new wave guitarist (Xutos & Pontapés)

December
 2 
 Norihiko Hashida (72), Japanese folk singer and songwriter (The Folk Crusaders)
 Mundell Lowe (95), American jazz guitarist
 6  – Johnny Hallyday (74), French rock singer
7 – Sunny Murray (81), American free jazz drummer
 8 – Gloria Ann Taylor (73), American soul singer
 12
 Pat DiNizio (62), American power pop singer and guitarist (The Smithereens)
 Willie Pickens (86), American jazz pianist
 13
Dave Christenson (54), American new wave singer (Stabilizers)
 Warrel Dane (56), American heavy metal singer (Sanctuary, Nevermore)
 Rory O'Donoghue (68), Australian rock and pop guitarist
 16
 Ralph Carney (61), American rock and jazz saxophonist and clarinetist (Tin Huey)
 Richard Dobson (75), American country singer and songwriter
 Michael Prophet (60), Jamaican reggae singer
 Keely Smith (89), American jazz singer
 17  – Kevin Mahogany (59), American jazz singer
 18  – Kim Jong-hyun (27), South Korean K-pop singer and songwriter (Shinee)
 19  
 Jim Forrester (43), American hard rock bassist (Sixty Watt Shaman)
 Leo Welch (85), American gospel blues singer and guitarist
 21  
 Roswell Rudd (82), American free jazz trombonist
 Marilyn Tyler (91), American opera singer
 22  – Pam the Funkstress, American hip hop DJ (The Coup)
25  – Nao (56), Japanese heavy metal vocalist (United)
 28 
 Rose Marie (94), American actress, singer and comedienne
 Curly Seckler (98), American bluegrass guitarist and mandolinist (Foggy Mountain Boys, Nashville Grass)
 31  – Maurice Peress (87), American conductor and music educator

See also 

 Timeline of musical events
 Women in music

References

 
2017-related lists
Music by year